The 2009 Guia Race of Macau (formally the 2009 Marriott Guia Race of Macau) was the twelfth and final round of the 2009 World Touring Car Championship season. It was the fifth running of the Guia Race of Macau as a World Touring Car Championship round. It was held on 22 November 2009 on the temporary Guia Circuit around the streets of Macau. The race was part of the Macau Grand Prix weekend, headlined by the Formula Three event.

Race One was won by Chevrolet's Robert Huff, while BMW Team Germany driver Augusto Farfus won Race Two. SEAT Sport driver Gabriele Tarquini won the 2009 championship after finishing fifth in Race Two. SEAT beat BMW to the Manufacturer's title, and Tom Coronel won the Independent's Trophy.

Background
Gabriele Tarquini went to Macau with a two-point lead over SEAT Sport teammate and reigning champion Yvan Muller. Thirteen points behind Tarquini was BMW Team Germany driver Augusto Farfus. In the Manufacturers' Championship, SEAT had a three-point lead over BMW. In the Independents' Trophy, Tom Coronel had a thirty-point advantage over Félix Porteiro, although double points were available for Independents in Macau in addition to the bonus points for a top-eight overall finish.

Five local drivers raced in Macau. Guia regular André Couto replaced João Paulo de Oliveira in the third SUNRED Engineering car. Liqui Moly Team Engstler ran five cars in Macau, with regulars Franz Engstler and Kristian Poulsen joined by Henry Ho, who raced for the team at the previous round in Japan, and series debutants Alex Liu and Joseph Rosa Merszei. Masaki Kano, who drove for the team in Japan, did not race in Macau. Lei Kit Meng made his debut in a BMW 320si run jointly by China Dragon Racing and RPM Racing Team. Also, Takayuki Aoki replaced fellow Japanese driver Seiji Ara in the second Wiechers-Sport car.

Report

Testing and Free Practice
Augusto Farfus topped the test session on Thursday ahead of BMW Team Germany teammate Jörg Müller, ahead of Chevrolet's Rob Huff. The same three drivers filled the top three positions in the same order in the first practice session on Friday. Huff set the quickest time in the second session ahead of BMW Team UK driver Andy Priaulx, Müller and Farfus. The session was red-flagged in the final minutes of the session after Gabriele Tarquini crashed his SEAT.

Qualifying
Huff took pole position, ahead of Priaulx and Farfus. Championship rivals and SEAT Sport teammates Tarquini and Yvan Muller crashed in the second session that determines the starting order for the top ten positions. Muller lost control on cement dust that had been laid on the track following an earlier accident for James Thompson. Unsighted by the dust, Tarquini hit Muller's car, and the pair were then hit by Alain Menu. The three drivers lined up seventh, eighth and ninth, ahead of Rickard Rydell who suffered engine problems at the end of Q1.

Lada Sport teammate Thompson crashed into the abandoned Wiechers-Sport car of Stefano D'Aste during Q1. Thompson was taken to hospital and although he was later released he had suffered bruising to his feet, stopping him from competing in the races. He would not have been able to race anyway as his car was too badly damaged in the crash. D'Aste also missed the races as his car was also badly damaged, as did Thompson's teammate Kirill Ladygin who also crashed during qualifying. Muller and Tarquini were also taken to hospital following their accident, but both were cleared to race after their cars were repaired.

Race One
Rob Huff took a commanding victory for Chevrolet from pole position in the first race. His fellow front-row starter Andy Priaulx dropped back from the rolling start and ran wide at the first turn, hitting the wall. Tiago Monteiro moved up to second place, while Gabriele Tarquini made his way from seventh to third. On lap eight Monteiro slowed, teammate Tarquini passing him for second place. Jordi Gene finished third, ahead of Alain Menu. Monteiro also allowed title contender Yvan Muller through, before BMW drivers Augusto Farfus and Jörg Müller also dropped back to finish seventh and eighth, giving them a front-row start for Race Two.

Tom Coronel finished 13th overall, beating rival Felix Porteiro to the Independents' class victory.

Race Two
Farfus led away from pole position to win the final race of the season, while Tarquini took the 2009 title after finishing fifth. BMW Team Germany teammate Jörg Müller held off pressure from SEAT drivers Yvan Muller and Tiago Monteiro, while Tarquini had moved up to fifth position. A crash for Tom Boardman brought out the safety car on the third lap. The race was red-flagged at the end of lap eight after a major accident at the final turn involving Felix Porteiro, Franz Engstler and André Couto. Porteiro ran wide and hit the barriers, before being hit by Engstler. Engstler's car was left stranded in the middle of the track, where he was collected heavily by Couto. Engstler suffered a broken collarbone in the accident. The race was halted, and eventually it was decided that it would not be restarted.

As the results were taken from the end of lap seven, Porteiro was given the Independents' victory.

Results

Qualifying

Race 1

Bold denotes Fastest lap.

Race 2

Bold denotes Fastest lap.

Standings after the event

Drivers' Championship standings

Yokohama Independents' Trophy standings

Manufacturers' Championship standings

 Note: Only the top five positions are included for both sets of drivers' standings.

References

External links
 Results Booklet PDF at MST Systems

Macau
Guia Race of Macau
2009 in Chinese motorsport